Windows Production Pvt Ltd is an Indian film production and distribution company based in Kolkata. The company was established by   Nandita Roy and Shiboprosad Mukherjee in 2002. The company is one of the leading Bengali film production houses in Eastern India.

Films

References

Companies of India
Shiboprosad Mukherjee
2002 establishments in India
Indian film distributors
Film production companies based in Kolkata